Afrasiab or Afrasiabi may refer to:
Name of the mythical King Afrasiab, hero of Turan and an enemy of Iran
Kaveh L. Afrasiabi, a political scientist and author